Cannabis is illegal in the Marshall Islands.

Law
The possession, sale, disposition, cultivation, production, and prescribing of cannabis is regulated by the Narcotic Drugs (Prohibition and Control) Act 1987.

Possession
It is illegal to possess cannabis under Section 903 of the Narcotic Drugs (Prohibition and Control) Act 1987.

Exceptions for medical use
An individual may possess cannabis if it is obtained pursuant to a valid prescription of a medical practitioner under Section 904 of the Act. Despite this section, medicinal cannabis is not available on the islands.

Sentence

First offence: Possession of one ounce or less
If an individual is convicted of possession of one ounce or less on a first offence, they are subject to a fine between $1,000 and $5,000 or imprisonment between six months and one year, or both.

First offence: Possession of more than one ounce
If an individual is convicted of possession of more than one ounce on a first offence, they are subject to a fine between $5,000 and $25,000 or imprisonment between one and five years, or both.

Second offence: Possession of one ounce or less
If an individual is convicted of possession of cannabis of one ounce or less on a second or subsequent conviction, they are subject to a fine between $5,000 and $25,000 or imprisonment between one and five years, or both.

Second offence: Possession of more than one ounce
If an individual is convicted of possession of more than one ounce on a second or subsequent conviction, they are subject to a fine between $25,000 and $50,000 or imprisonment between five and fifteen years, or both.

References

Marshall Islands